Gulf Brook is a river in Delaware County in New York. It flows into Holliday Brook east-southeast of Downsville.

References

Rivers of New York (state)
Rivers of Delaware County, New York